The 2018 Canadian Tire National Skating Championships took place January 8–14, 2018, in Vancouver, British Columbia. Organized by Skate Canada and sponsored by Canadian Tire, the event determined the national champions of Canada. Medals were awarded in the disciplines of men's singles, women's singles, pair skating, and ice dance on the senior, junior, and novice levels. Although the official International Skating Union terminology for female skaters in the singles category is ladies, Skate Canada uses women officially. The results of this competition were among the selection criteria for the 2018 Winter Olympics, the 2018 World Championships, the 2018 Four Continents Championships, and the 2018 World Junior Championships.

Vancouver was named as the host in January 2017. Competitors qualified at the Skate Canada Challenge held in Pierrefonds, Quebec in December 2017.

Schedule 
All times are in PTZ.

Medal summary

Senior

Junior

Novice

Senior results

Men

Women

Pairs

Ice dance

Junior results

Men

Women

Pairs

Ice dance

Novice results

Men

Women

Pairs

Ice dance

International team selections

Winter Olympics 
The team for the 2018 Winter Olympics was announced on January 14, 2018.

World Championships 
The team for the 2018 World Championships was announced on January 14, 2018.

Four Continents Championships 
The team for the 2018 Four Continents Championships was announced on January 14, 2018.

World Junior Championships 
The team for the 2018 World Junior Championships was announced on January 14, 2018.

References

Citations

External links 
 

Canadian Figure Skating Championships
Figure skating
Canadian Figure Skating Championships
Sports competitions in Vancouver
Canadian Figure Skating Championships
January 2018 sports events in Canada